The 2021 Belarusian Premier League was the 31st season of top-tier football in Belarus. Shakhtyor Soligorsk were the defending champions, having won their second league title last year. Shakhtyor Soligorsk won their third Belarusian Premier League title.

Teams

The bottom two teams from the 2020 season (Belshina Bobruisk and Smolevichi) were relegated to the First League (both relegated after one-year in the top flight). They were replaced by Sputnik Rechitsa (promoted to the top-flight for the first time in their history) and Gomel (promoted after a one-year absence), champions and runners-up of the 2020 Belarusian First League respectively.

In the winter 2020/21, Gorodeya (who finished 13th last year) dissolved and left a Premier League spot vacant. Smorgon (6th-placed team of last year's First League season, promoted after an eleven-year absence) were admitted to fill the vacancy, after Krumkachy Minsk (First League 3rd-placed team) were denied Premier League license, and another two clubs (Arsenal Dzerzhinsk and Lokomotiv Gomel) rejected the opportunity due to insufficient financing.

Personnel

Managerial changes

League table

Results
Each team plays home-and-away once against every other team for a total of 30 matches played each.

Relegation play-offs 
The 14th-place finisher of this season (Slavia Mozyr) played a two-legged relegation play-off against the third-placed team of the 2021 Belarusian First League (Krumkachy Minsk) for a spot in the 2022 Premier League.

Leg 1

Leg 2

Statistics

Top goalscorers

Hat-tricks

Disciplinary

Most yellow cards: (8)
  Júlio César (Vitebsk)
  Giorgi Kantaria (Neman Grodno)
  Alimardon Shukurov (Neman Grodno)
  Vladislav Yatskevich (Smorgon)
  Igor Tymonyuk (Slavia Mozyr)
Most red cards: (2)
  Júlio César (Vitebsk)
  Sulley Muniru (Minsk)
  Alyaksey Hawrylovich (Neman Grodno)

Awards

Weekly awards

Player of the Week

Goal of the Week

Monthly awards

Player of the Month

Goal of the Month

Manager of the Month

References

External links
 

2021
Belarus
Belarus
1